Stephanocleonus is a genus of cylindrical weevils in the beetle family Curculionidae. There are at least 70 described species in Stephanocleonus.

Species
These 70 species belong to the genus Stephanocleonus:

 Stephanocleonus albithorax Ter-Minasian, 1973
 Stephanocleonus albofasciatus Ter-Minasian, 1972
 Stephanocleonus amori Marseul, 1868
 Stephanocleonus amurensis Ter-Minasian, 1977
 Stephanocleonus analis Voss, 1967
 Stephanocleonus approximatus Voss, 1967
 Stephanocleonus argenteus Ter-Minasian, 1989
 Stephanocleonus axillaris Chevrolat, 1873
 Stephanocleonus bogdoensis Ter-Minasian, 1978
 Stephanocleonus changajensis Voss, 1967
 Stephanocleonus chankanus Suvorov, 1915
 Stephanocleonus confusus Anderson, 1987
 Stephanocleonus corpulentus Voss, 1967
 Stephanocleonus cristaticollis (Csiki, 1934)
 Stephanocleonus divisiventris Marshall, 1934
 Stephanocleonus dutensis Ter-Minasian, 1989
 Stephanocleonus eous Ter-Minasian, 1976
 Stephanocleonus eruditus Faust, 1890
 Stephanocleonus fenestratus (Pallas & P.S., 1781)
 Stephanocleonus flaviceps
 Stephanocleonus foveifrons Chevrolat, 1873
 Stephanocleonus gemellus Voss, 1967
 Stephanocleonus giganteus Ter-Minasian, 1970
 Stephanocleonus glaucinus Suvorov, 1912
 Stephanocleonus gobianus Suvorov, 1911
 Stephanocleonus gobiensis Ter-Minasian, 1974
 Stephanocleonus grigorievi Suvorov, 1915
 Stephanocleonus grumi Suvorov, 1911
 Stephanocleonus helenae Ter-Minasian, 1973
 Stephanocleonus hexagraptus Petri, 1915
 Stephanocleonus ignobilis Faust, 1883
 Stephanocleonus immaculatus Anderson, 1987
 Stephanocleonus improcerus Suvorov, 1912
 Stephanocleonus incertus Ter-Minasian, 1972
 Stephanocleonus inopinatus Ter-Minasian, 1972
 Stephanocleonus isochromus Suvorov, 1912
 Stephanocleonus jenisseicus Ter-Minasian, 1978
 Stephanocleonus kerzhneri Ter-Minasian, 1973
 Stephanocleonus kobdoanus Suvorov, 1915
 Stephanocleonus kozlovi Suvorov, 1911
 Stephanocleonus leucostis Suvorov, 1912
 Stephanocleonus lukjanovitshi Ter-Minasian, 1975
 Stephanocleonus macrogrammus Petri, 1914
 Stephanocleonus medvedevi Ter-Minasian, 1989
 Stephanocleonus montanus Ter-Minasian, 1990
 Stephanocleonus muchei Voss, 1967
 Stephanocleonus nassiformis (Goeze & J.A.E., 1777)
 Stephanocleonus nasutus Ballion, 1878
 Stephanocleonus novus Ter-Minasian, 1978
 Stephanocleonus optimus Ter-Minasian, 1978
 Stephanocleonus parallelistriis Ter-Minasian, 1972
 Stephanocleonus parshus Anderson, 1987
 Stephanocleonus plumbeus LeConte, 1876
 Stephanocleonus postfemoralis Ter-Minasian, 1970
 Stephanocleonus posttibialis Voss, 1967
 Stephanocleonus roddi Suvorov, 1912
 Stephanocleonus sejunctus Faust, 1904
 Stephanocleonus shansiensis Ter-Minasian, 1987
 Stephanocleonus sibiricus Ter-Minasian, 1970
 Stephanocleonus similis Ter-Minasian, 1978
 Stephanocleonus sinitsyni Legalov, 1999
 Stephanocleonus stenothorax Anderson, 1987
 Stephanocleonus stratus Faust, 1904
 Stephanocleonus sublaevigatus Ter-Minasian, 1973
 Stephanocleonus suvorovi Legalov, 1999
 Stephanocleonus tetragrammus (Pallas & P.S., 1781)
 Stephanocleonus tibetanus Suvorov, 1915
 Stephanocleonus tshuicus Suvorov, 1912
 Stephanocleonus tuvensis Ter-Minasian, 1978
 Stephanocleonus veretshagini Suvorov, 1912

References

Further reading

 
 
 

Lixinae
Articles created by Qbugbot